"Living Better Now" is a song by American recording artist Jamie Foxx, released on November 2, 2010 as the second single for his fourth studio album Best Night of My Life (2010). It features American rapper Rick Ross and samples "Big Poppa" by The Notorious B.I.G.

Track listing
Digital download
"Living Better Now" (featuring Rick Ross) - 4:08

Charts

Release history

References

External links
 Full lyrics on Rap Genius

2010 songs
2010 singles
Jamie Foxx songs
J Records singles
Songs written by Ernie Isley
Songs written by Marvin Isley
Songs written by O'Kelly Isley Jr.
Songs written by Ronald Isley
Songs written by Rudolph Isley
Songs written by Rico Love
Songs written by Jamie Foxx
Songs written by Chef Tone
Songs written by Rick Ross
Songs written by Bink (record producer)